Dead House, also known as Beautiful People, is a 2014 Italian zombie horror film that was directed by Brini Amerigo.

Synopsis
The Pontecorvo family is just settling down to dinner when three thugs, Testamento, Nibbio, and Nibbo's brother Brett, break into their home. They quickly set about capturing the family and forcing them to participate in despicable acts. The thugs are unaware that the scientist father, John Pontecorvo, has been working on an experiment that can bring the dead back to life as savage zombies in the house's basement. These undead are released after Testamento ventures into the basement looking for something to steal. The Pontecorvos are then forced to fight for their lives against not only their human captors but also the undead looking to kill them as well.

Cast
 Danny Cutler as Nibbio
 Alex Lucchesi as Testamento
 Alex Southern as Brett
 Kate Davies-Speak as Elena Pontecorvo
 David White as John Pontecorvo
 James Wiles as Paul Pontecorvo
 Vanina Marini as Anna Hicks
 Alexandra Antonioli as Sara Hicks
 Ettore Nicoletti as Luca Hicks

Production
Filming for Dead House took place in Italy under the title Beautiful People. The movie marked Amerigo's feature film debut. British actor Kate Davies-Speak was brought in to play as Elena, the matriarch of the Pontecorvo family.

Release
The film screened during July 2014 at the 10th Grossmann Fantastic Film and Wine Festival in Slovenia, under the title Beautiful People. It continued to screen at film festivals such as Fantafestival under this name until it received a title change to Dead House for its 2018 release in the United States through Wild Eye Releasing.

Reception
HorrorNews.net reviewed the film under its original and US release titles, with both reviewers noting that the movie had a lot of graphic violence. James Perkins of Starburst praised the film for its blend of genres, as well as for its acting. Modern Horrors felt that the movie "may be uneven, but that doesn’t mean it isn’t good. This is NOT a traditional zombie flick." Nick Rocco Scalia of Film Threat was critical of the movie, writing that it "might bring to mind something like the bikers/zombies/heroes fracas of the second half of George Romero’s Dawn of the Dead, but Dead House has none of that classic film’s wit, substance, finely wrought human drama, or beautifully orchestrated mayhem."

References

External links
 
 
2014 horror films
Italian zombie films
2014 directorial debut films
Home invasions in film